The Bridgton and Saco River Railroad (B&SR) was a  narrow gauge railroad that operated in the vicinity of Bridgton and Harrison, Maine. It connected with the Portland and Ogdensburg Railroad (later Maine Central Railroad Mountain Division) from Portland, Maine, to St. Johnsbury, Vermont, near the town of Hiram on the Saco River.

History

B&SR design was based on experience of the Sandy River Railroad.  Hinkley Locomotive Works modified their  gauge Forney design to run boiler first with an extended frame similar to that installed on Sandy River Railroad #1 following a wreck in early 1882.  The successful design of the Bridgton Hinkleys was subsequently repeated for the Monson Railroad and the Franklin and Megantic Railway.  Construction began in 1882, and trains were running to Bridgton by early 1883.

B&SR used early profits to replace wooden trestles with earthen fills. A  granite masonry arch was constructed over Hancock Brook in 1895. Track was extended to Harrison with 35# steel rails in 1898. Trestles on the Harrison extension had been replaced by earthen fills and plate girder bridges by 1906. Original Hinkley locomotives #1-2 were replaced by #5-6 of an improved design with pilot wheels.

Under Maine Central operation, there were 4 mixed train round trips daily from Harrison to Bridgton Junction and return.  The first left Harrison at 5:15 am and the last returned to Harrison at 8:45 pm.  Train speed seldom exceeded .  Two passenger train sets were required for this service.  The first consisted of baggage #10, RPO #25, and one or two coaches.  A couple of bench seats at one end of baggage-RPO #11 provided smoking accommodation for the second train set.  Freight traffic in 1913 was 18% outbound lumber, 15% outbound pulpwood, 15% inbound coal, 11% outbound apples and canned corn, 11% manufactured goods, 10% feed & grain, 10% express, and 2% inbound petroleum products.  Locomotive #8 was the last locomotive built for the Maine  gauge railways.

Bond interest went unpaid in 1926, and the town of Bridgton began a 15-year effort to preserve their railroad.  The B&SR was reorganized as the Bridgton and Harrison Railway; but the extension to Harrison was dismantled after locomotive #8 tipped over when the 35# rails sagged in 1930.  Locomotive #8 was the heaviest locomotive on any  gauge railway in Maine.  B&SR became a tourist attraction as the last  gauge railroad offering passenger service in the late 1930s.  Operation ceased in September 1941.  The rolling stock was preserved when the rails were converted to scrap metal as the United States prepared for World War II.  The rolling stock was moved to Massachusetts for another half-century of operation on the Edaville Railroad after the war.  Subsequent to the restructuring of the Edaville Railroad, the historic Bridgton and Saco narrow gauge equipment returned to the state of Maine and are mostly located at the Maine Narrow Gauge Railroad Co. & Museum in Portland.

There are still signs of the B&SR evident in a few places if one searches carefully for them.  Members of the Wiscasset, Waterville and Farmington Railway Museum have organized informal tours in the past several years to explore these remains.  A new group, the Bridgton & Saco River Railroad Museum, was established in 2020 and have plans to build a new railyard in Bridgton for a museum and possible tourist railroad on the original right of way between Sandy Creek and Perleys Mills. More info can be found about this new revival of the Bridgton & Saco River on their website at Bridgtonrailroad.org.

Geography

Milepost 0: Bridgton Junction - Interchange yard with the Portland and Ogdensburg (later Maine Central Railroad Mountain Division.)  Agent's station shared with Maine Central Railroad.  B&SR had 6 northbound spurs plus a turntable with a single-stall enginehouse.  The freight house spur was dual gauge, and there was a second dual gauge spur for loading and unloading narrow gauge-equipment on standard-gauge cars.  There was no runaround track; so southbound B&SR locomotives uncoupled their train on the main line, moved into the yard, threw a turnout, and let their train roll past them into the yard by gravity to avoid being trapped at the end of the spur.

Milepost 0.8: Scribner's - southbound spur.

Milepost 1: granite masonry arch over Hancock Brook.

Milepost 1.2: Small's

Milepost 2.0: Rankin's Mill - small flag stop passenger shelter.

Milepost 2.7: Mullen Siding - northbound spur.

Milepost 3: Summit - highest point on the railroad.

Milepost 4: Fill over the north end of Barker pond with granite masonry abutments for a short timber stringer span on the boundary between Hiram and the town of Sebago.

Milepost 4.4: Twin Lake - small flag stop passenger shelter.

Milepost 5.4: Gravel Pit - northbound spur.

Milepost 7: The Notch - a rock cut.

Milepost 7.2: West Sebago - southbound spur with small flag stop passenger shelter.

Milepost 7.5: Water Tank Siding - passing siding adjacent to Hancock Pond.  The main line ran between Hancock Pond and B&SR superintendent Joseph Bennett's lakeside cottage a short distance south of the covered water tank.

Milepost 9.0: Perley's Mills - southbound spur with small flag stop passenger shelter.

Milepost 10.5: Ingall's Road - southbound spur with small flag stop passenger shelter.

Milepost 11.3: Kennett's - southbound spur.

Milepost 12.1: South Bridgton - southbound spur with small flag stop passenger shelter.

Milepost 13: high fill with granite masonry abutments for a short timber stringer span over Willett Brook.

Milepost 13.5: Sandy Creek - agent's station with passing siding serving a sawmill.

Milepost 15.8: Bridgton - had the largest population of any village served by the Maine  gauge railroads.  The yard was on the stub of a wye with branches to Harrison and Bridgton Junction.  There were 2 storage sidings and 4 spurs serving the agent's station, a separate freight house, a team track, an oil distributor, a grain store, the B&SR shop, and a turntable with a 4-stall enginehouse.

Milepost 15.9: Farmers Market - two northbound spurs (one was a coal trestle.)

Milepost 16.4: Forest Mills—passing siding with a northbound coal trestle spur.

Milepost 19.5: North Bridgton - agent's station with passing siding serving a separate freight house.

Milepost 20.7: Harrison - agent's station with a passing siding and several southbound spurs serving a freight house, a cannery, a grain store, a 2-track car shed, and a turntable with a single-stall enginehouse.

Master Mechanic Caswell
Bridgton machine shop foreman Millard M. "Mel" Caswell was born in 1850.  He took an early interest in mechanical affairs of the proposed railroad and served as master mechanic for the B&SR until he retired in 1926.  He remained interested in the railroad and frequently attended the railfan excursions of the 1930s.  His son, Wilfred H. Caswell, was born in 1876 and shared his father's mechanical aptitude.  Wilfred Caswell was the engineer assigned to the construction train for the Harrison extension in 1898.  Wilfred was the Portland Company mechanical engineer who supervised construction of the first Maine narrow gauge Forney locomotive with a pilot truck (B&SR locomotive number 5) in 1906.  Wilfred then served as a consulting engineer for Baldwin Locomotive Works during construction of B&SR locomotive number 6 and an identical locomotive for the Sandy River Railroad.  In May 1909 Wilfred became master mechanic of the Sandy River and Rangeley Lakes Railroad (SR&RL).  Wilfred's early recognition of the technical value of photography produced excellent photographic documentation of SR&RL operations through the period of Maine Central Railroad ownership.  When SR&RL profits declined in 1922, Wilfred and his wife Blanche, who had been the SR&RL book-keeper, moved to Dedham, Massachusetts, where Wilfred worked for the New York, New Haven and Hartford Railroad.

Locomotives

Rolling stock

Footnotes

References
 
 
 
  
 
 
 
 
 
 
 
  1895, 1896, 1897, 1898, 1899, 1900, 1901, 1902, 1903, 1904, 1905, 1906, 1907, 1908, 1909, 1910, 1911, 1912, 1913 and 1914

External links
 Bridgton & Saco River Narrow Gauge Railroad
 Maine Narrow Gauge Railroad Co. & Museum

 Wiscasset Waterville and Farmington Railway Museum

Defunct Maine railroads
Narrow gauge railroads in Maine
2 ft gauge railways in the United States
American companies established in 1883
Railway companies established in 1883
Railway companies disestablished in 1930
1883 establishments in Maine
1940s disestablishments in Maine